Martine L. Jacquot (born 1955) is a French-born novelist, poet, short story writer and journalist, living in Canada since 1982. She has a doctorate in French literature.

Early life and education
Martine Lydie Jacquot was born in La Ferté-Gaucher, France, May 27, 1955, and spent her first five years in Saint-Mars-en-Brie, France.

She obtained her baccalaureate from the Lycée de Coulommiers in 1974. She then entered the Sorbonne Nouvelle University Paris 3 in Paris, where she earned a BA in English in 1977 and an MA in British literature in 1979. She taught for a year in Canterbury, England at the Simon Langton Girls' Grammar School, and then studied at the University of Provence Aix-Marseille I (preparation for the Capes and Agrégation of English). She worked for a few months at the Danish Consulate General in Marseille, France, then at CERN in Geneva, Switzerland, as a bilingual secretary.

She moved to Nova Scotia, Canada, in September 1981, and obtained a Bachelor's degree in journalism from the University of King's College in Halifax in 1984, a Master's degree in Canadian literature from Acadia University in 1986 and a Ph.D. in French literature from Dalhousie University in Halifax in 1995 with a thesis entitled, .

Career

She teaches at various universities (Dalhousie, Acadia, St. Mary's, St. Anne's) as well as being a journalist (Ven'd'est, Le Courrier de la Nouvelle-Écosse, among others), and translator.

She was President of the Conseil Culturel Acadien de la Nouvelle-Écosse (CCANÉ) for three years and created the magazine ARTcadie. She was a member of the Board of Governors of the Nova Scotia Museum for 12 years. She is editor-in-chief of the academic journal Les Cahiers canadiens based at the Volgograd State University in Russia and a long-time contributor to Arabic-language publications such as Ashtarowt and Al Quds.

A prolific, internationally-published, polygraphic author, she is a poet, novelist, short story writer, essayist, and children's author. She is one of the few Acadian authors of short stories. These are collected in Sables mouvants (1994), Des Oiseaux dans la tête (1998), and Les enjoliveurs du temps (2023). Most of her work is contemporary, but she has moved into historical fiction with Au gré du vent (2005), set in Halifax and southwestern Nova Scotia during the second half of the 19th century, for which she has written a sequel. Her Nanouk series, centered around a husky, is particularly popular with young readers. Her novels often centre around a protagonist (sometimes also a narrator) who makes a journey or displacement that causes her to reconsider her family or social situation.

Awards and honours
 1987, Short story prize, Revue Liaison, for Des Yeux d'Irlande
 1990, President's Award, literary contest of the Société Culturelle du Haut Saint-Jean, Edmundston, New Brunswick, for Les Nuits Démasquées
 1992, Short story award, Revue Liaison, with Jazz
 1994, Winner, "L'Acadie à découvrir" contest, SRC radio
 1997, Winner, Concours de vieux mots acadiens, SRC radio 
 2004, Acadia Student Union Teaching Recognition Award
 2007, Special mention, ADELF European Award, for Au gré du vent6
 2022, Prix d'Excellence, French & Friends Multilingual Book Festival, Washington, D.C., with Filigrane and La couleur du désir

Selected works 

 Les terres douces : roman, 1988
 Route 138, 1989
 Fleurs de pain : poésie, 1991
 Les nuits démasquées, 1991
 Espaces du réel, cheminements de création : Michel Goeldlin, 1995 
 Les glycines : roman 1996
 Des oiseaux dans la tête : nouvelles, 1998
 Etapes : poèmes choisis (1982-1995), 2001
 Points de repère sur palimpseste usé : poésie, 2002
 Masques : roman, 2003
 Le secret de l'île, 2003
 Au gré du vent ... : roman, 2005
 Le silence de la neige : poésie, 2007
 Duras, ou, Le regard absolu, 2009
 La bande à Nanouk : roman jeunesse, 2009
 Les oiseaux de nuit finissent aussi par s'endormir : roman , 2014

References

1955 births
Living people
People from Seine-et-Marne
University of Provence alumni
University of King's College alumni
French emigrants to Canada
Acadia University alumni
Dalhousie University alumni
Academic staff of the Dalhousie University
Academic staff of Acadia University
Academic staff of the Saint Mary's University (Halifax)
21st-century French novelists
21st-century French poets
21st-century French short story writers
21st-century French translators
Journalists from Nova Scotia